Kim Hyon-il (born 28 December 1976) is a North Korean gymnast. He competed at the 2004 Summer Olympics.

References

External links
 

1976 births
Living people
North Korean male artistic gymnasts
Olympic gymnasts of North Korea
Gymnasts at the 2004 Summer Olympics
Place of birth missing (living people)
Asian Games medalists in gymnastics
Gymnasts at the 1998 Asian Games
Gymnasts at the 2002 Asian Games
Asian Games gold medalists for North Korea
Medalists at the 2002 Asian Games
21st-century North Korean people